The Howell Heflin Lock and Dam, formerly Gainesville Lock and Dam, is one of four lock and dam structures on the Tennessee-Tombigbee Waterway that generally lie along the original course of the Tombigbee River. It is located near Gainesville, Alabama, and impounds Gainesville Lake. It is named for Howell Heflin, a former United States Senator from Alabama.

See also
List of Alabama dams and reservoirs

References

Dams in Alabama
Locks of Alabama 
Buildings and structures in Greene County, Alabama
Tennessee–Tombigbee Waterway
Crossings of the Tombigbee River
Dams completed in 1977
Transportation buildings and structures in Greene County, Alabama